Dmitry Vitalyevich Monakov (Ukrainian: Дмитро Віталійович Монаков, Russian: Дмитрий Витальевич Монаков, 17 February 1963 in Kiev, Soviet Union – 21 November 2007 in Kyiv, Ukraine) was a Soviet and Ukrainian shooter. He was an Olympic champion in 1988 in trap shooting.

Monakov won the Olympic (1988), World (1987, 1994) and European (1988) championships. He participated in the 1996 Olympics on the Ukrainian team but didn't win any medal. Afterwards, he was a coach of the national team.

Monakov died on 21 November 2007 from a thrombus problem.

He was buried at Berkovtsi cemetery.

Notes

References
 

1963 births
2007 deaths
Shooters at the 1988 Summer Olympics
Shooters at the 1996 Summer Olympics
Olympic shooters of the Soviet Union
Olympic shooters of Ukraine
Sportspeople from Kyiv
Soviet male sport shooters
Ukrainian male sport shooters
Trap and double trap shooters
Olympic medalists in shooting
Honoured Masters of Sport of the USSR

Medalists at the 1988 Summer Olympics
Olympic gold medalists for the Soviet Union